The Manchester Met Mystics is a women's basketball team from Manchester, England, who compete in the Women's British Basketball League. The team play their home games at the National Basketball Centre.

Honours
WBBL Cup
Winners (1): 2016-17.

Season-by-season records

Players

Current roster

<!<--end list of players-->

Former players include: 

U14,
Hannah Alty,
Natalie Joyce,
Janey Murphy,
Kelly Humphries,
Aleiha Johnson,
Anna Williams,
Lucy Williams,
Alison,
Sola Darby,
Nocole Taylor,

U16,
Holly Rush,
Leah McDermett,
Lily Crompton,
Natalie Feurtado,
Melissa Golaub,
Danielle Griffiths,
Mollie Campbell,
Katie Rowlands,
Danielle Johnson,
Kayleigh Johnson,
Ashley Tensel,
Lucy Rogan,
Saira Hillyard,
Hannah Alty

U18,
Kathryn Benson,
Catherine Meakin,
Maeve Higham,
Ashley Woodacre,
Charlotte Hughes,
Nicolette Fly,
Tracey Caton,
Holly Rush,
Fern Clarke,
Rosie Hynes,
Catherine Meakin,
Mollie Campbell,
Ashley Tensel,
Shahad Jarad, 
Rebecca Stoddart, 
Hannah Alt,

Women,
Emma Macready,
Nicki Blakeway,
Hannah Alty,
Nicolette Flq,
Kelela Blake,
Amy Browne,
Hannah Shaw,
Jamie Curtis,
Jade Lucas,
Gina Brierley,
Natalie Feurtado, 
Catherine Meakin, 
Emma Lyonette, 
Claire Perry 
EBL Division 1 2013-14

4 Amelia Reynolds 1.65m Point Guard
5 Kelsey Bardsley 1.62m Point Guard
6 Nicki Blakeway 1.80m Forward
7 Rehana Khalil 1.71m Shooting Guard/PGd
8 Georgia Jones 1.73m Point Guard
9 Joanna Clayden 1.80m Shooting Guard/Fwd
10 Sandra Guadalix 1.80m Shooting Guard/Fwd
11 Lauren Quigley 1.80m Shooting Guard/Fwd
12 Charlotte Stoddart 1.81m Shooting Guard/Fwd
13 Kristie Sheils 1.70m Guard
14 Lara Maestre 1.80m Shooting Guard/Fwd
15 Megan Osmer 1.90m Centre
Paige Livingston 1.80m Forward
Coach: Sergio Lara-Bercial
Asst Coach: Jimmy Bardsley, Sean Reynolds
Manager: Freda Jones
Stats: Aline Macready
Physio: Ed Walsh
Music: Don Johnson

See also
Manchester Magic

External links
Official Manchester Mystics website

Women's British Basketball League teams
Sport in Manchester
Women's basketball teams in England
Basketball teams established in 1997
1997 establishments in England